Andone is a surname. Notable people with the surname include:

Bogdan Andone (born 1975), Romanian footballer and coach
Florin Andone (born 1993), Romanian footballer
Ioan Andone (born 1960), Romanian footballer and coach
Ludmila Andone (born 1989), Moldovan footballer

See also
Andon (name)